The Madrid–Levante high-speed network is a network of high-speed rail lines that connects Madrid with the Mediterranean coast of the Levante Region, specifically with Castilla-La Mancha, the Valencian Community and the Murcia Region autonomous communities.

The network extends from Madrid to the east, with branches ending in Castellón, Alicante, Elche, Murcia, Cartagena and continuing from Murcia to Almería.

Segments

Madrid–Cuenca–Motilla del Palancar–Valencia
The first  of this  line are shared with the existing Madrid–Seville high-speed rail line. The section onwards to Valencia was inaugurated on 15 December 2010 and entered service on 19 December 2010.

Thirty trains run every day, fifteen in each direction. 22 are non-stop services and the remaining eight call at intermediate stations.

Valencia–Castellón 
This segment was inaugurated on 22 January 2018 and is a part of the Mediterranean Corridor. With this extension to Castellón a new AVE service Madrid-Castellón was introduced which cut the journey time between the two cities by further 30 minutes to total 2 hours and 25 minutes.

Four AVE trains per day are scheduled, two in each direction between Madrid and Castellón while this segment is also used by the Alvia service Gijón–Castellón.

Valencia–Xàtiva 
Segment under construction. Planned for mixed use (goods and passengers).

Xàtiva–Nudo de La Encina 

Motilla del Palancar–Albacete 
A  segment between Cuenca and Albacete provinces. This section was inaugurated on 15 December and open to the public on 19 December 2010.

Albacete–Nudo de La Encina–Monforte del Cid–Alicante 
The  section from Albacete to Alicante opened in June 2013.

Monforte del Cid–Elche–Murcia–Cartagena 
This section is fitted with three track rails, two of standard gauge and one of Iberian gauge.

Murcia–Almería 

The main purpose of this line is to connect the Transversal Rail Line to the Madrid-Levante and Mediterranean Corridor rail lines.

Stations

Madrid-Atocha 

Madrid Atocha (also named Madrid Puerta de Atocha) is the largest railway station in Madrid. Atocha also hosts commuter trains (Cercanías), intercity and regional trains from the south, and AVE high-speed trains to Barcelona (Catalonia) and Seville (Andalusia).

These services are run by the national rail company, Renfe. The station is in the Atocha neighbourhood of the Arganzuela district.

Cuenca-Fernando Zóbel 
It is named after painter Fernando Zóbel to commemorate his links to the city. The station occupies 3.950 m2 with 8.900 m2 of parking space.

Albacete-Los Llanos 

Requena-Utiel 
A new  station called Requena-Utiel was built with parking space for at least 250 cars. It brings the two small towns of Requena and Utiel on to the high-speed map./

Valencia Central Station 
A new Valencia Central Station will be built that eventually replaces the existing Valencia North station. It will be 12 tracks wide in 2 subterranean levels.

Villena AV 
Located  from Villena town centre.

Alicante 
Current terminus of the Alicante branch at the existing Alicante railway station.

Elche AV 
A  station was planned for opening at the end of 2019, with parking space for 500 cars and 50 motorcycles. This was subsequently delayed until 2021.

Orihuela
The existing railway station at Orihuela is served by the AVE line.

Future expansion
The network is under construction to expand to Murcia (and eventually Cartagena) by 2022, and to be connected to Almería in the Mediterranean Corridor by 2024.

Stations

Murcia 
The new intermodal Murcia del Carmen railway station will be close to the present station. It will be 8 rail tracks wide and will serve buses and local trains.

Cartagena 
It is yet unclear whether the current Cartagena railway station, located next to the old town, will be the final station for high speed services or a new station will be built on the outskirts of the city. Construction of the high speed railway between Murcia and Cartagena is scheduled to begin in 2018, and be complete by 2022.

See also 
 AVE Spanish high-speed train service

References

External links 
 AVE at the RENFE 

High-speed railway lines in Spain
Rail transport in Madrid
Rail transport in Barcelona
Railway lines opened in 2010
25 kV AC railway electrification